Auriol Smith is an English actress and theatre director. She was a founder member and associate director of the Orange Tree Theatre in Richmond, London. She co-founded the theatre in 1971 with her husband Sam Walters, who became the United Kingdom's longest-serving artistic director.  Walters and Smith stepped down from their posts at the Orange Tree Theatre in June 2014.

Early years
Whilst taking a degree in drama at Bristol University she became President of the Green Room Society at the newly founded university Drama Department. This was followed by a year in America as a Fulbright Scholar, before making her professional debut at the Hampstead Theatre Club in January 1960 in Harold Pinter's first play The Room (which she had originally played in a converted squash-court for the Bristol Drama Department in May 1957).

Orange Tree Theatre
After extensive experience in repertory theatres and a year in Jamaica setting up a drama school and theatre, she and her husband Sam Walters co-founded the Orange Tree Theatre in Richmond, London in 1971, where she played many classic and modern parts. "We enjoyed doing small-scale productions in Jamaica, and hoped that eventually we'd run that kind of theatre in England. Then, when we returned in 1971, we decided that now was the time and Richmond (where we lived) was the place." (Auriol Smith in conversation with Marsha Hanlon for the Orange Tree Appeal brochure, 1991).

Performances
In the old theatre:
Penelope in A Slight Accident (James Saunders) Lunchtimes, January 1976
Find Me (Olwen Wymark) 1977
Teacher in The Primary English Class (Israel Horovitz) November 1979
Woman in Living Remains (Martin Crimp) Lunchtimes, 9–25 July 1982
 
The new theatre opened in February 1991. Her Orange Tree performance credits there included:
Countess Czernyak in His Majesty (Harley Granville Barker) 1992 – also Edinburgh International Festival
Mary Faugh in The Dutch Courtesan (John Marston) 1992
Hester Bellboys in Penny For a Song (John Whiting) 1992
Dorothy in Nice Dorothy (David Cregan) 1993
Mariette in Doctor Knock (Jules Romains) 1994
Emma in Family Circles (Alan Ayckbourn) 1996 and 1997
Mme Lepine in Overboard (Michael Vinaver) part of a French season in 1997
Aglae in Court in the Act (farce Maurice Hennequin and Pierre Veber) 1998
Lady Wishfort in The Way of the World (Congreve) 1999
Mme Dupont in Have You Anything to Declare? (farce Hennequin and Veber) 2001
Widow Warren in The Road to Ruin (Thomas Holcroft) 2002
Helena in Previous Convictions (Alan Franks) 2005
Lady Smatter in The Woman Hater (Fanny Burney) 2007
Grandma, Rieger's mother in Leaving (Václav Havel) 200)

Directing
From 1991 to 2014 she also regularly directed at the Orange Tree. Her credits included: 
Cat With Green Violin (Jane Coles) 1991
The Case of Rebellious Susan (Henry Arthur Jones) 1994: Time Out Award 1994
The Verge (Susan Glaspell) 1996
Love Me Slender (Vanessa Brooks) 1997
Dissident, Goes Without Saying (Michael Vinaver) 1997
Lips Together, Teeth Apart (Terrence McNally) 1998 and 1999
The Cassilis Engagement (St John Hankin) 1999
The Captain's Tiger (Athol Fugard) 2000
Flyin' West (Pearl Cleage) 2001
Three Sisters Two (Reza de Wet) 2002
The House of Bernarda Alba (Federico García Lorca) 2003
Simplicity (Lady Mary Wortley Montagu after Pierre Marivaux) 2003
Doña Rosita the Spinster (Lorca) 2004
The Women of Lockerbie (Deborah Brevoort) 2005
Tosca's Kiss (Kenneth Jupp) 2006
Nan (John Masefield) 2007
Chains (Elizabeth Baker) 2007
Mary Goes First (Henry Arthur Jones) 2008
The Ring of Truth (Wynyard Browne) 2009
Mary Broome (Allan Monkhouse) March 2011

Other acting and directing work
During 1990, as part of a busy year, she played Lady Wishfort in The Way of the World at the Royal Exchange Manchester (deputising for Sylvia Syms who was indisposed), and toured North America for the ACTER company in The Winter's Tale playing opposite Paul Shelley as Leontes. She also appeared in Christine Edzard's film The Fool.

In the West End for producer Bill Kenwright, Smith directed Dead Guilty by Richard Harris (Apollo 1995) starring Hayley Mills and Jenny Seagrove; and Michael Redgrave's The Aspern Papers (Wyndham's 1996) with Hannah Gordon. She also directed a Japanese version of Dead Guilty in Japan.

At the Theatre Royal Windsor directed  Shadow of a Doubt and Canaries Sometimes Sing. At the Northampton Theatre Royal she directed Arthur Miller's Broken Glass, David Mamet's Oleanna and James Robson's Mail Order Bride; while at the Stephen Joseph Theatre in Scarborough she first directed  Love Me Slender.

Television and audio
She worked extensively on radio including Pinter's 1960 radio version of his sixty-minute play The Room for the BBC Third Programme. For ten years she presented Listen with Mother on BBC Radio 4 and was a long-serving member of the Radio Drama Company. Her BBC radio credits include Alan Bennett's Forty Years On, the role of a tipsy summer partygoer in Ellen Dryden's romantic comedy Forgetting Rosalind (a FirstWrites production for the BBC), and East of the Sun by Carey Harrison.

For Naxos, Smith recorded the roles of Alice in Henry V with Samuel West, and the Duchess of York in Richard III with Kenneth Branagh. She has also acted on television in Kavanagh QC, One Foot in the Grave, Peak Practice and Doctors, among others.

Honours
She and her husband Sam Walters received the Freedom of the London Borough of Richmond upon Thames in December 2014.

Private life
Auriol Smith is the wife of Orange Tree co-founder and former artistic director Sam Walters, whom she met while doing pantomime at Rotherham in 1962. They have two daughters: Dorcas Walters, who was principal dancer with Birmingham Royal Ballet and now works in arts administration, and Octavia Walters, formerly an actress, now a sports injury masseur.

References

Sources
 Auriol Smith's Orange Tree Theatre programme CVs, 1991 and 2007
 Michael Billington (1996) The Life and Work of Harold Pinter. Faber 
 Theatre Record and its annual Indexes

External links
Orange Tree Theatre website 

Living people
English theatre directors
English television actresses
English stage actresses
English radio actresses
Year of birth missing (living people)